Baykal Point (‘Nos Baykal’ \'nos bay-'kal\) is the mostly ice-covered rocky point projecting 800 m south-southwestwards into Lanusse Bay on the west coast of Brabant Island in the Palmer Archipelago, Antarctica.

The point is named after the settlements of Baykal in Northern and Baykalsko in Western Bulgaria.

Location
British mapping in 1980 and 2008.

Maps
 Antarctic Digital Database (ADD). Scale 1:250000 topographic map of Antarctica. Scientific Committee on Antarctic Research (SCAR). Since 1993, regularly upgraded and updated.
British Antarctic Territory. Scale 1:200000 topographic map. DOS 610 Series, Sheet W 64 62. Directorate of Overseas Surveys, Tolworth, UK, 1980.
Brabant Island to Argentine Islands. Scale 1:250000 topographic map. British Antarctic Survey, 2008.

References
 Bulgarian Antarctic Gazetteer. Antarctic Place-names Commission. (details in Bulgarian, basic data in English)
 Baykal Point. SCAR Composite Antarctic Gazetteer.

External links
 Baykal Point. Copernix satellite image

Headlands of the Palmer Archipelago
Bulgaria and the Antarctic